The  ran from 1971 to 1989. It was a drivers' championship in Japan and was originally for 2 litre Group B6 cars. The series was started in 1971, and all races were held at the Fuji Speedway circuit.

History 

In its formative years, cars eligible to start included the March 74S, Alpine A441, Chevron, Lola and GRD.

In its fourth year of running, it had its first fatalities. At the start of the second race of the second round of the 1974 series, two cars were racing for the lead. They collided and Hiroshi Kazato and Seiichi Suzuki crashed into them, causing a fire. Both Kazato, 25, and Suzuki, 37, were killed. The race was immediately abandoned, and the circuit was reconstructed with the hairpin first corner that exists to this day, bypassing the banking.

A change in the rules in 1979 made it possible for single seat sports cars, similar to the revived Can-Am series, to race in the series.

In the second race of 1983 Famiyasu Sato was killed in practice. Later in the series, Toru Takahashi was killed when his car spun, and the aerodynamics of the car caused it to fly through the air, driver's head-first into the catch fencing, also killing a spectator.  This led to a further change in the circuit where a chicane was added in 300R (the final corner) to slow the cars.

The maximum engine size limit was increased to 3 litres in 1987. In 1988, the series changed its name from Fuji Grand Champion series to Grand Champion series because some races added into the championship were not held at Fuji.

The late 1980s saw attendance dropping, and after 1989 the series folded.

Revival
The series was revived again in 2002 as GC-21, like its predecessor; the series used Dallara GC21 cars, which were rebodied F3 cars powered by 3S-GTE engines. Like its predecessor, it raced exclusively at Fuji Speedway with the exception of 2004, when the circuit was undergoing a major renovation work. Despite running on a small field (usually five and six cars at a time), it ran on into 2006 when the series again folded. Between 2006 and 2007, it formed part of the LMP2 class in the Japan Le Mans Challenge.

Champions

See also
Fuji Long Distance Series
1999 Le Mans Fuji 1000 km
Japan Le Mans Challenge

References

Resources
Fuji Grand Champion Series results

Sports car racing series
Auto racing series in Japan